Jew Point is a headland in Monroe County, Florida.

The waters near Jew Point offer boaters on the Intracoastal Waterway as a place of refuge during bad weather.

The name Jew Point was named after Logan Ermans. Nevertheless, media commentators have questioned the appropriateness of the name.

References

Landforms of Monroe County, Florida
Headlands of Florida